Zvezda Stadium, until 1991 Lenin Komsomol Stadium, is a multi-use stadium in Perm, Russia. It is currently used mostly for football matches and is the home ground of FC Zvezda Perm. The stadium holds 17,000 people and was opened on June 5, 1969.

The field was covered with artificial turf in 2005.

External links
 Zvezda Stadium — at the website of Amkar fans
 Zvezda Stadium

Football venues in Russia
Sport in Perm, Russia
FC Amkar Perm
Sports venues built in the Soviet Union
Sports venues completed in 1969
Buildings and structures in Perm, Russia